Teochew  or Chiuchow  (peng'im: Dio⁵ziu¹ ) is a historical area that is mostly within the modern Chaoshan region, eastern Guangdong, China.

Teochew may also refer to:

Teochew dialect, a dialect of Southern Min Chinese, commonly used in eastern Guangdong and Southeast Asia
Teochew people, a group of people originating from eastern Guangdong, known as the Teochew prefecture during the Qing dynasty
Teochew cuisine, a branch of Chinese cuisine created by the Teochew people
Teochew opera, a branch of traditional Chinese opera originating from Chaoshan

The most common modern romanization for the characters is Chaozhou using Hanyu Pinyin. Teochew is a local romanisation of 潮州.

Chaozhou (Mandarin romanization) or Teochew may also mean:

Chaozhou city, a prefecture-level city in Guangdong, China
Chaozhou, Pingtung (潮州鎮), an urban township in western Pingtung County, Taiwan
5217 Chaozhou, a main belt asteroid

See also
Zhaozhou (disambiguation)

Language and nationality disambiguation pages